Nactus is a genus of geckos, lizards in the family Gekkonidae.  The genus is endemic to Oceania.

Species
The following 35 species are recognized as being valid, and some species have recognized subspecies.
Nactus acutus Kraus, 2005
Nactus aktites Zug, 2020 – Madang coastal slender-toed gecko 
Nactus allenallisoni Zug, 2020 – Madang slender-toed gecko 
Nactus alotau Zug, 2020 – southern forest slender-toed gecko 
Nactus amplus Zug, 2020 – Louisiade giant slender-toed gecko 
Nactus arceo Zug, 2020 – Morotai slender-toed gecko 
Nactus arfakianus Meyer, 1874 – Arafak slender-toed gecko 
Nactus cheverti (Boulenger, 1885) – Chevert's gecko, southern Cape York nactus
Nactus chrisaustini Zug, 2020 – Milne Bay pygmy slender-toed gecko 
Nactus coindemirensis Bullock, Arnold & Bloxam, 1985 – lesser night gecko
Nactus eboracensis (Macleay, 1877)
Nactus erugatus Zug, 2020 – Milne Bay smooth-tailed slender-toed gecko 
Nactus fredkrausi Zug, 2020 – Kraus's giant slender-toed gecko 
Nactus galgajuga (Ingram, 1978) – Black Mountain gecko, Black Mountain slender-toed gecko
Nactus grevifer Zug, 2020 – Torricelli slender-toed gecko 
Nactus heteronotus (Boulenger, 1885) – central savanna slender-toed gecko
Nactus intrudusus Zug, 2020 – Markham slender-toed gecko
Nactus inundatus Zug, 2020 – Fly River slender-toed gecko 
Nactus kamiali Zug, 2020 – Kamiali slender-toed gecko 
 Nactus kunan Fisher & Zug, 2012
Nactus modicus Zug, 2020 – Louisiade slender-toed gecko 
Nactus multicarinatus (Günther, 1872)
Nactus nanus Zug, 2020 – dwarf North-coast slender-toed gecko 
Nactus notios Zug, 2020 – southern mountains slender-toed gecko 
Nactus panaeati Zug, 2020 – Panaeati slender-toed gecko 
Nactus papua Zug, 2020 – Papuan slender-toed gecko 
Nactus pelagicus (Girard, 1858) – pelagic gecko, Pacific slender-toed gecko, rock gecko
Nactus rainerguentheri Zug, 2020 – Vogelkop slender-toed gecko
Nactus robertfisheri Zug, 2020 – Bismarcks slender-toed gecko
Nactus septentrionalis Zug, 2020 – North Coast Papuan slender-toed gecko
Nactus serpensinsula (Loveridge, 1951) – Serpent Island gecko
Nactus soniae Arnold & Bour, 2008 - extinct
Nactus sphaerodactylodes Kraus, 2005
Nactus undulatus (Kopstein, 1926) – Kei rock gecko
Nactus vankampeni (Brongersma, 1933) – van Kampen's gecko

Nota bene: A binomial authority or trinomial authority in parentheses indicates that the species or subspecies was originally described in a genus other than Nactus.

References

Further reading
Kluge AG (1983). "Cladistic Relationships among Gekkonid Lizards". Copeia 1983 (2): 465–475. (Nactus, new genus).

 
Lizard genera
Taxa named by Arnold G. Kluge